The Werewolf of Washington is a 1973 horror comedy film written and directed by Milton Moses Ginsberg and starring Dean Stockwell.  Produced by Nina Schulman, it satirizes several individuals in the Richard Nixon administration.

Plot summary

Jack Whittier (Dean Stockwell) is the press secretary for the White House and for the President of the United States; while on assignment in Hungary, he is bitten by a wolf who actually turns out to be a man. When Jack tries to report it, he believes it is the work of Communists. He then meets a gypsy woman who tells him it was her son and he needed to die to be saved. She then gives him a charm and tells him to be careful now that he may suffer the same effects.

When he returns to Washington D.C., he is assigned to the President (Biff McGuire); he has also been having an affair with the President's daughter Marion (Jane House). Jack suddenly starts to feel different changes about him whenever the moon is full. Numerous murders suddenly occur all over Washington, all related to the President's staff. Jack is now convinced that he is a werewolf; when he tries to explain this to his superior, Commander Salmon  (Beeson Carroll), the latter does not believe him. Jack then presents a pattern of where the murders have happened in the shape of a pentagram; he convinces him (Salmon) to lock him in his apartment and restrain him and also to be documented. The President needs Jack for a special interview with the Chinese prime minister; however, Jack starts to change into a werewolf and he attacks the President.

He then leaves for Marion, who then shoots him with a silver bullet, thus killing him and changing him back to his human form. Many witnesses decide to cover up the act saying Jack bravely came into the line of fire.

In audio over the closing credits, the President addresses the nation. At the very end, he starts to change into a werewolf.

Cast
 Dean Stockwell as Jack Whittier
 Katalin Kallay as Giselle
 Henry Ferrentino as Beal
 Despo Diamantidou as Gypsy Woman
 Thayer David as Inspector
 Nancy Andrews as Mrs. Margie Captree
 Clifton James as Attorney General
 Biff McGuire as The President 
 Jack Waltzer as Appointments Secretary
 Ben Yaffee as Mr. Captree
 Jane House as Marion
 Beeson Carroll as Commander Salmon
 Michael Dunn as Dr. Kiss
 Harry Stockwell as Military #2

Release
The film was originally released theatrically in the United States by Diplomat in 1973.

On VHS and DVD, the film has been released by various labels over the years with questionable legitimacy to the rights and subpar presentations. It was also released on DVD by Shout Factory as part of the Elvira's Movie Macabre series, hosted by Elvira, played by Cassandra Peterson.

See also
 List of American films of 1973

References

External links

The Werewolf of Washington at Google Videos
The Werewolf of Washington in Elvira Movie Macabre App

1973 films
1970s comedy horror films
American comedy horror films
American independent films
American satirical films
Films set in Washington, D.C.
American werewolf films
Films about fictional presidents of the United States
Cultural depictions of Richard Nixon
American supernatural horror films
American exploitation films
1973 comedy films
1970s English-language films
1970s American films